The 2015 North Miami mayoral election happened on May 12, 2015 in North Miami, Florida. Before the election, Jean Rodrigue Marcellus was disqualified as his check to pay the qualifying fee for the race was returned due to insufficient funds. This meant that incumbent mayor Smith Joseph was unopposed, and as such, no voting occurred.

Candidates

 Smith Joseph — Incumbent Mayor since 2014 (Democratic Party)
 Jean Rodrigue Marcellus (disqualified) — District 3 Councilman from 2009 to 2013 (Democratic Party)

Results

References 

North Miami
2015